Biscaino may refer to:
 Italian for Biscayne
 A nonstandard spelling of Vizcaíno

People
 Bartolomeo Biscaino (1632–1657), Italian painter of the Baroque period, son of Giovanni Andrea
 Giovanni Andrea Biscaino (died 1657), Italian painter of the Baroque period, father of Bartolomeo
 Yusuf Biscaino (fl. 1610–11), Morisco in the service of the Moroccan Sultan Mulay Zidan